Sirius is the tenth album by Irish folk group Clannad, released in 1987. It features several guest artists such as Bruce Hornsby, Steve Perry and J.D. Souther.

Cover
The cover of Sirius shows a newly blonde Moya Brennan with the rest of Clannad standing beside a waterfall on the River Crolly in their hometown of Gweedore (Gaoth Dobhair).

Track listing
 "In Search of a Heart" (Pól Brennan) – 3:53
 "Second Nature" (Ciarán Brennan) – 3:20
 "Turning Tide" (P. Brennan) – 4:39
 "Skellig" (C. Brennan) – 4:46
 "Stepping Stone" (P. Brennan) – 3:53
 "White Fool" - feat. Steve Perry (P. Brennan) – 4:38
 "Something to Believe In" - Duet with Bruce Hornsby (C. Brennan) – 4:47
 "Live and Learn" (C. Brennan) – 3:32
 "Many Roads" (C. Brennan) – 3:25
 "Sirius" (P. Brennan) – 5:33

2003 re-master bonus tracks

11. "The Hunter" – 4:08 (single version) [original album version on Past Present]

12. "World of Difference" – 4:01 [from the album Past Present]

Charts

Singles
 "Something to Believe In"
 "White Fool"

References

1987 albums
Clannad albums
Albums produced by Greg Ladanyi
Albums produced by Russ Kunkel
RCA Records albums
Albums recorded at Rockfield Studios